Vyjayanthi Chari (born 1958) is an Indian–American Distinguished Professor of mathematics at the University of California, Riverside, known for her research in representation theory and quantum algebra. In 2015 she was elected as a fellow of the American Mathematical Society.

Education 
Chari has a bachelor's, master's, and doctoral degree from the University of Mumbai. Chari received her Ph.D. from the University of Mumbai under the supervision of  Rajagopalan Parthasarathy.

Professional career 
Following her Ph.D., she became a fellow at the Tata Institute of Fundamental Research, Mumbai. In 1991, she joined the University of California, Riverside (UCR) where  she is now a Distinguished Professor of Mathematics. During her career, she has had several visiting positions. They were: invited senior participant at the Mittag-Leffler Institute, Sweden; an invited professor at the University of Cologne, Germany; an invited professor at Paris 7, France; an invited research fellow at Brown University, RI; and an invited senior participant at Hausdorff Research Institute for Mathematics, Bonn, Germany;  and visiting professor at the University of Rome Tor Vergata, Italy.

She is also the editor of the Pacific Journal of Mathematics and the Editor in Chief of Algebras and Representation Theory.

With Andrew N. Pressley, she is the author of the book A Guide to Quantum Groups (Cambridge University Press, 1994).

Honors 

 The Doctoral Dissertation Advisor/Mentor Award from the UCR Academic Senate.
 American Mathematical Society 2016 Class of Fellows.
 Simons Fellow 2019–2020.
Infosys Visiting Chair Professor, Indian Institute of Science, 2019–2023.

References

External links

1958 births
Living people
20th-century American mathematicians
21st-century American mathematicians
20th-century Indian mathematicians
Indian women mathematicians
University of Mumbai alumni
University of California, Riverside faculty
Fellows of the American Mathematical Society
American people of Indian descent
20th-century women mathematicians
21st-century women mathematicians
20th-century Indian women